Kenneth Samuel Wilkinson (b 1931) is an Anglican priest: he was Archdeacon of Ferns from 1998 until 2008.

Wilkinson was educated at Trinity College, Dublin and ordained  in 1961. He was a curate at St. Michan, Dublin then the Incumbent at Killegney from 1967 to 1970. After that he was at Enniscorthy until 2002.

References

1931 births
Living people
Archdeacons of Ferns
Alumni of Trinity College Dublin